KSWB-TV (channel 69) is a television station in San Diego, California, United States, affiliated with the Fox network. Owned by Nexstar Media Group, the station maintains studios on Engineer Road in the city's Kearny Mesa section, and its transmitter is located southeast of Spring Valley. KSWB-TV is branded as Fox 5 San Diego, in reference to its primary cable channel number in the market.

KSWB-TV went on the air as independent station KTTY in 1984. It was the third independent station in the market with programming that was generally inferior to its two competitors. In 1994, the station was placed into bankruptcy to avoid foreclosure. Tribune Broadcasting won the bidding to purchase KTTY in 1995, and it was relaunched as KSWB-TV on August 16, 1996. Stronger programming, including The WB, and the start of a new local newscast, which was on air from 1999 to 2005, dramatically improved its on-air product.

In 2008, Tribune reached a deal to make KSWB-TV the region's new Fox affiliate, displacing XETV, a Tijuana-based independent that had long targeted the U.S. market. The move led the station to restart its own local newscasts.

History

Early years as KTTY
The insertion of another television station into the San Diego area was first proposed by businessman Charles Woods in 1978. He had proposed that channel 27 be allocated to the city and sought to build a new Spanish-language outlet; however, a revised agreement with Mexico gave that country channel 27 for Tijuana, and channel 69 was proposed in its stead. Ten to twelve applications were received, and eight were designated for comparative hearing by the Federal Communications Commission (FCC) in 1982. The field of applicants consolidated after the hearing designation by way of settlements and mergers and was whittled down eventually to five. Four of these groups consolidated: a group of Asian businessmen headed by former San Diego city councilor Tom Hom; Black investor J. Bruce Llewellyn and several other East Coast interests; Gil Contreras, leading a Hispanic group; and a White group led by Jim Harmon, the president of Imperial Airlines. Harmon was the brother of former KFMB-TV co-owner Helen Alvarez Smith. They then settled with the fifth group—Christian Communications Network, owned by evangelist Jerry Barnard—and agreed to air its programming.

This cleared the way for the consortium known as San Diego Television to get a construction permit on January 3, 1983. However, nearly two years would pass before KTTY began to broadcast. One complication arose when the Llewellyn group opted to sell, suffering from the difficulty of living on the East Coast and trying to set up a West Coast TV station, and wound up being bought out by the other groups for $2 million. Technical issues also had to be resolved; when the antenna was shipped, it was first delivered to the studios in Chula Vista, not to the San Miguel Mountain transmitter site where it needed to be installed. The Chula Vista studio site was chosen for its access to I-5 and relative lack of congestion; this contrasted with the situation in the Kearny Mesa area, where most San Diego TV stations are located.

KTTY began broadcasting on September 30, 1984, mostly airing classic movies and old syndicated reruns, as well as Newspot news briefs throughout the day. In its first year, ratings were low; even some Los Angeles independent stations, seen on San Diego cable systems, surpassed it in the ratings. It aired San Diego State Aztecs sports and such local productions as Beach Party, a show filmed on local beaches described by its producer as "PM Magazine meets American Bandstand for teenagers". As an independent station, KTTY consistently trailed XETV (channel 6) and KUSI-TV (channel 51) in the quality of its programming and its ratings. It promoted itself as "San Diego's Movie Channel", but John Freeman, TV writer for The San Diego Union-Tribune, called it in retrospect "a laughingstock—bankrupt and virtually bereft of watchable programming". The Harmon/Alvarez Smith group became the primary owners of San Diego Television in 1986 when the group obtained a $17 million bank loan.

Sale to Tribune; WB and CW affiliation
San Diego Television filed for Chapter 11 bankruptcy reorganization on February 2, 1994. This action was undertaken by Alvarez Smith in order to protect KTTY from foreclosure on the 1986 loan. In the year that followed, the station did make two upgrades that helped bolster its reputation. As part of a new San Diego Padres rights package, KTTY picked up a scheduled 36 games a season for two years, one of three different outlets airing Padres games in 1994 and 1995 (alongside KFMB-TV and Prime Sports). It also affiliated with The WB, one of two new networks launching in January 1995.

On August 29, 1995, in a Los Angeles courtroom, bidders competed at bankruptcy auction to buy KTTY. Prior to the auction, offers for the station had hovered between $40 and $42 million. In an event described as "exciting" by an observer, and amidst a frenzied market for TV stations nationally, bidding was fierce. After groups including Newsweb and Viacom dropped out, third-place finisher New World Communications exited when the price reached $60 million, leaving Tribune Broadcasting and United Television—associated with The WB's rival, UPN—to fight it out in a bidding war. After both parties bid in 22 rounds to push the price to $70 million, Tribune bid $70.5 million without United matching it, winning the right to buy KTTY. After the debts—which had increased to $26 million—were covered, the owners of San Diego Television split $44 million.

Tribune assumed control of KTTY on April 19, 1996; 20 people lost their jobs, as the new owners only rehired 34 of the 54 employees of the station, and new programming started to debut. For the new television season in September, KTTY changed its call sign to KSWB-TV almost a month prior, on August 16 of that same year. It also moved on San Diego cable systems from channel 14 to channel 5, which had previously been assigned to Tribune's Los Angeles WB station, KTLA.

In 2000, a marketing campaign conducted by the station in which it mailed VHS tapes to 75,000 San Diego-area homes and urged homes reporting in Nielsen Media Research ratings diaries, "Attention Nielsen homes: Please watch KSWB 5/69", led to Nielsen taking action against the station. It delisted KSWB from its ratings for an entire survey period; a Nielsen spokesman noted that this action was a first in company history.

WB News at Ten
As early as 1997, rumors circulated of the potential for KSWB to launch a local newscast, possibly using the resources of another station in the market. Local stations in San Diego had previously inquired as to the station airing local newscasts produced by them when it was KTTY. However, Tribune opted instead to start a news operation of its own for KSWB. To house this expansion, the station had to move from Chula Vista and found a sufficiently large site in Kearny Mesa, down the street from NBC station KNSD-TV (channel 39).

The WB News at Ten, a half-hour 10:00 p.m. newscast, began to air on September 27, 1999. It was designed to cater to viewers aged 18 to 49; the average age of the initial on-air presenters was 29. It was the second prime time newscast in San Diego, with KUSI-TV having aired one since 1990; both stations were joined three months later by a startup 10 p.m. newscast from XETV, which was bolstered by its Fox affiliation to beat KSWB's offering in the ratings. KUSI's ratings generally compared to XETV's and KSWB's combined. On March 7, 2005, the station debuted The WB Morning Show, a simulcast of Los Angeles sister station KTLA's weekday morning newscast interspersed with half-hourly local news inserts presented by a solo anchor from KSWB's San Diego studios.

News outsourcing and transition to The CW

On September 21, 2005, KSWB announced that its news department would be shut down, with 30 news staffers to be laid off. The final 10:00 p.m. newscast produced by KSWB aired on October 28, 2005. Production of the prime time newscast was turned over to KNSD, which began producing the newscast on October 31 using the same newscast title and imaging. Tribune made an identical decision that same day at another WB affiliate it owned, WPHL-TV in Philadelphia, where that city's NBC-owned station would begin producing its local 10 p.m. newscast.

On January 24, 2006, Time Warner and CBS Corporation announced that the two companies would shut down the broadcast networks that they had respectively owned, The WB and UPN, and create a new merged network, The CW, to begin that September. With the announcement, The CW signed a ten-year affiliation agreement with Tribune Broadcasting for 16 of the group's 19 WB affiliates, with KSWB-TV named as the network's San Diego affiliate.

To correspond with KSWB's affiliation change to The CW, the KTLA morning news simulcast and the KNSD-produced 10:00 p.m. news were accordingly renamed as The CW Morning Show and CW News at Ten on September 18, 2006. The newscast was anchored by Vic Salazar and Anne State, both of KNSD. The station also aired a public affairs program, Take 5, on Sunday evenings; this was hosted by Perette Godwin, who also anchored the morning newscast cut-ins.

Fox affiliation
During a seminar by then-owner Sam Zell on March 25, 2008, it was revealed that Tribune Broadcasting had signed an affiliation agreement with Fox to make KSWB-TV the network's new San Diego affiliate effective August 1. In making the switch, Fox's executive vice president of network distribution, Jon Hookstratten, cited the fact that, as a Mexican station, XETV—an original Fox affiliate from the network's creation in 1986—had to answer to a different communications regulator, the Secretariat of Communications and Transportation, as one reason for the changeover. Tribune had initiated talks with Fox in December 2007; the network had already been talking with KUSI-TV owner McKinnon Broadcasting about a potential affiliation.

The news blindsided XETV management, which contended their Fox affiliation agreement ran through 2010, and represented the second time that station's Mexican location had cost it a network affiliation after an FCC ruling forced ABC to move to a U.S. station in 1973. It gave Tribune a seventh station airing Fox programming, solidifying its status as the second-largest Fox affiliate owner.

On July 2, 2008, Bay City Television/Grupo Televisa signed an affiliation agreement to bring The CW's programming over to XETV. With the Fox affiliation agreement, KSWB-TV's ten-year contract with The CW was rendered void, and KSWB-TV and XETV exchanged affiliations on August 1, 2008. The switch was also met with an open letter from XETV management, stating in part, "Unfortunately, in these troubled times, it seems as though there is no honor or loyalty anymore."

In 2017, Sinclair Broadcast Group announced it had agreed to purchase Tribune Media for $3.9 billion. As part of divestitures associated with the deal, KSWB-TV and other stations were to be sold to Fox Television Stations. Both transactions were nullified on August 9, 2018, when Tribune Media terminated the Sinclair deal and filed a breach of contract lawsuit; this followed a public rejection of the merger by FCC chairman Ajit Pai and the commission voting to put the transactions up for a formal hearing.

Following the merger's collapse, Nexstar Media Group announced a $6.4 billion all-cash purchase of Tribune Media on December 3, 2018. The sale was completed on September 19, 2019, with KSWB not subject to any additional transactions.

News operation

The Fox affiliation deal kickstarted the return of in-house local news production to KSWB-TV, with Tribune initially stating it aimed to produce three to four hours a day of local news. Tribune tapped Rich Goldner, news director at KTLA, to move south to San Diego and set up a newsroom at KSWB-TV.

Upon the affiliation switch on August 1, 2008, KSWB-TV debuted a new weekday morning news program (initially airing from 5:00 to 9:00 a.m. and hosted by Arthel Neville) and an hour-long 10:00 p.m. newscast, both produced in high definition. A total of 50 staffers were added to KSWB to facilitate the news revival.

In the years that followed, the station progressively added local newscasts. In 2009, a 6 p.m. news hour was introduced, followed by a 5 p.m. hour in 2011 and newscasts at 1 and 4 p.m. in 2014. A 7 p.m. newscast was added in 2020 and extended to an hour the next year. By 2022, KSWB was producing  hours of local news and sports programming a week, as well as a daily lifestyle show with paid segments, The Localist SD.

Notable former on-air staff
 Ali Fedotowsky – features/lifestyle reporter (later host of NBC's 1st Look, now correspondent for E! News)
 Kendis Gibson – anchor (formerly with NBC News and MSNBC, now with WFOR-TV)

Technical information

Subchannels
The station's digital signal is multiplexed:

Analog-to-digital conversion
KSWB shut down its analog signal, over UHF channel 69, on February 17, 2009, the original target date on which full-power television stations in the United States were to transition from analog to digital broadcasts under federal mandate (which was later pushed back five months to June 12, 2009). The station's digital signal remained on its pre-transition UHF channel 19. The station was repacked from channel 19 to 26 in 2019.

See also
Channel 5 branded TV stations in the United States
Channel 26 digital TV stations in the United States
Channel 69 virtual TV stations in the United States

References

External links
www.fox5sandiego.com - KSWB-TV official website
www.fox5sandiego.antennatv.tv - KSWB-DT2 ("Antenna TV San Diego") official website

Fox network affiliates
Antenna TV affiliates
Court TV affiliates
Ion Television affiliates
Nexstar Media Group
Television channels and stations established in 1984
SWB
1984 establishments in California